Maha Al-Demerdash Al-Demerdash Shehata (born 13 February 1989) is an Egyptian footballer who plays as a goalkeeper for Romanian club Piros Security and the Egypt women's national team. She played in the Turkish Women's First Football League for Trabzon İdmanocağı with jersey number 1.

Early life
Al-Demerdash was born on 13 February 1989 in Gharbia Governorate, Egypt.

Playing career

Club

Shehata played for the Cairo-based Wadi Degla SC before she moved in November 2017 to Turkey to join Trabzon İdmanocağı, who play in the Turkish Women's First Football League.

International
Shehata appeared for the Egypt women's national football team  at the 2016 Africa Women Cup of Nations held in Cameroon.

References

Living people
1989 births
People from Gharbia Governorate
Women's association football goalkeepers
Egyptian women's footballers
Egypt women's international footballers
Egyptian expatriate footballers
Egyptian expatriate sportspeople in Turkey
Expatriate women's footballers in Turkey
Trabzon İdmanocağı women's players